The Left Youth (Vasemmistonuoret in Finnish, Vänsterunga in Swedish) is a political youth organization in Finland. It is considered the youth wing of the Left Alliance, but it is not officially affiliated with the party - members of the Left Youth are not automatically members of the Left Alliance.

The organization was founded in 1944. Until 1998, it was known as the Finnish Democratic Youth League (SDNL, Suomen demokraattinen nuorisoliitto) and until 1990 it served as the youth organization of the now-defunct Finnish People's Democratic League (SKDL). SDNL was a founding member of World Federation of Democratic Youth, but its main international frame used to be the European Network of Democratic Young Left until its dissolution.

Chairpersons

 Liban Sheikh 2020–
 Hanna-Marilla Zidan 2017-2019
 Anni Ahlakorpi 2015-2017
 Li Andersson 2011–2015
 Dan Koivulaakso 2009–2011
 Jussi Saramo 2005–2009
 Paavo Arhinmäki 2001–2005
 Sanna-Kaisa Cortés Téllez 1997–2001
 Marjo Katajisto 1995–1997
 Marko Autio 1991–1995
 Leena Ruotsalainen 1987–1991
 Rauno Merisaari 1985–1988

 Harri Moisio 1982–1985
 Markku Kärkkäinen 1976–1982
 Pekka Saarnio 1970–1976
 Ossi Sjöman 1964–1970
 Anna-Liisa Tiekso-Isaksson 1955–1964
 Markus Kainulainen 1952–1955
 Toivo Karppinen 1947–1952
 Yrjö Ahomaa 1945–1947

References

External links

Finnish People's Democratic League
Left Alliance (Finland)
Youth wings of Party of the European Left member parties
Youth wings of political parties in Finland